A banana boat  is a traditional campfire treat consisting of a banana cut lengthwise and stuffed with marshmallow and chocolate, then wrapped in aluminium foil and cooked in the embers left over from a campfire. Sometimes the banana boat is topped with caramel sauce prior to cooking. The banana boat is sometimes referred to as a hybrid between a banana split and a S'more.

See also
 S'more
 Sundae
 List of stuffed dishes

References

Snack foods
Chocolate desserts
Banana dishes
Stuffed desserts